Adesegun Olusola Ogunlewe (born 16 October 1953) is a Nigerian Public administrator, technocrat and  former Lagos State Head of Service.

Early life
Ogunlewe was born on October 16, 1953, at Ikorodu, a city and Local Government Area of Lagos State, Nigeria.
He had his elementary education at United African Methodist Church Primary School before he proceeded to  Oriwu College, lagos where he obtained the West Africa School Certificate in 1969. 
He received a bachelor's degree in Sociology from Obafemi Awolowo University in 1978 and a Post Graduate Diploma in Public administration.

Civil service
He joined the Lagos State Civil Service in 1979 as administrative officer after he completed his university education.
In May 2010, he was appointed as Head of Service to succeed Balogun Yakub Abiodun.
He retired from the civil service in October 2013 and was succeeded by Josephine Oluseyi Williams, whose appointment was confirmed in the same month by Babatunde Fashola, the Executive Governor of Lagos State.

References

1957 births
Living people
People from Lagos State
Lagos State civil servants
Obafemi Awolowo University alumni
Lagos State politicians
Yoruba politicians
People from Ikorodu